College Heights Secondary School is a public high school located in Guelph, Ontario, Canada. It is part of the Upper Grand District School Board.

History
College Heights Secondary School, founded in 1968, is a community-based school that works with industry, business and community organizations to support students. The program prepares students for apprenticeships, college or the workplace.  The program includes a wide variety of technical pathways as well as eight Specialist High Skills Major Programs.  In recent years the school has dramatically increased their student credit success rate, graduation rate and Literacy Test Success Rate.  The school population ranges between 580 and 650 students.

See also
List of high schools in Ontario

External links
Blog

High schools in Guelph
1968 establishments in Ontario
Educational institutions established in 1968